This article lists important figures and events in the public affairs of British Malaya during the year 1942, together with births and deaths of prominent Malayans. Malaya was occupied by Japanese forces at this time.

Events 
Below, the events of World War II have the "WW2" acronym
 6–8 January – WW2: Battle of Slim River
 11 January – WW2: Kuala Lumpur falls to the Imperial Japanese Army
 14 January – WW2: Battle of Gemas
 14–22 January – WW2: Battle of Muar
 23 January – WW2: Parit Sulong Massacre
 26–27 January – WW2: Battle off Endau
 31 January – WW2: By this date, all of Malaya was under Japanese control.
 12–15 February – WW2: Battle of Pasir Panjang
 18 February-8 March – WW2: Sook Ching Massacre

Births
 24 February – Mohd Radzi Sheikh Ahmad – Politician
 20 March – Abdullah Hassan – Linguist
 26 March – Muhammad Haji Salleh – Writer and National Sasterawan
 15 April – Rais Yatim – Politician
 20 April – Khadijah Hashim – Writer and author
 28 April - Sarimah Ahmad – Actress
 5 May – Shamsuri Arshad – Former Deputy Inspector General of Police
 25 July – Wan Zahidi bin Wan Teh – Federal Territory mufti
 31 August – Mahyon Ismail – Actor (died 2011)
 15 December – Hashim Bin Hj. Karim – Former Economic Advisor to former Prime Minister, Tun Hussein Onn and Tun Dr. Mahathir Mohamad
 Unknown date – Hassan bin Ahmad – Penang mufti
 Unknown date – S. Jibeng – Singer (died 2006)

Deaths 
 14 February – Adnan Saidi – Malay warrior

See also
 1942 
 1941 in Malaya | 1943 in Malaya
 History of Malaysia

References

1940s in Malaya
Malaya